Myingyi Kyun, also known as High Island, is a small island off the coast of Ayeyarwady Region, Burma.

Geography
  
It is part of a group of small islands and reefs lying west of Migyaungaung (Alligator Head).

Nearby islands
Saba Island  is a small islet located between South Reef and Alligator Head.

See also
List of islands of Burma

References 

Islands of Myanmar
Ayeyarwady Region